Dick's Picks Volume 8 is the eighth live album in the Dick's Picks series of releases by the Grateful Dead. It was recorded on May 2, 1970, at Harpur College (now Binghamton University) in Binghamton, New York. It was released in mid-1997.

The album contains the entire concert, except for one song — "Cold Rain and Snow", which was played between "Good Lovin'" and "It's a Man's Man's Man's World".  The first two verses of "St. Stephen" are also missing.  The first set of the concert was acoustic, and was recorded in stereo.  The second and third sets were electric, and were recorded in monaural.

In a 1993 poll of Grateful Dead tape traders, the 5/2/70 show was ranked #6 on the list of all-time favorite Dead concert tapes.

Caveat emptor
Each volume of Dick's Picks has its own "caveat emptor" label, advising the listener of the sound quality of the recording.  The label for volume 8 reads:

Enclosure
The release includes a single sheet folded in half yielding a four-page booklet. The first page repeats the cover art from the packaging. The second page provides the track list and credits. The third page reprints a stream-of-consciousness-style reivew of the show by Richard Walinsky originally published in the May 5, 1970, issue of the SUNY Binghamton Colonial News . The fourth page shows a small photo of the band.

Track listing

Disc one
First set
"Don't Ease Me In" (traditional) – 4:38
"I Know You Rider" (traditional) – 7:51
"Friend of the Devil" (Garcia, Dawson, Hunter) – 5:57
"Dire Wolf" (Garcia, Hunter) – 4:56
"Beat It on Down the Line" (Fuller) – 3:13 →
"Black Peter" (Garcia, Hunter) – 7:02
"Candyman" (Garcia, Hunter) – 1:43 →
"Cumberland Blues" (Garcia, Hunter, Lesh) – 5:47
"Deep Elem Blues" (traditional) – 7:30
"Cold Jordan" (traditional) – 2:35
"Uncle John's Band" (Garcia, Hunter) – 6:28

Disc two
Second set
"St. Stephen" (Garcia, Hunter, Lesh) – 3:23 →
"Cryptical Envelopment" (Garcia) – 1:54 →
"Drums" (Hart, Kreutzmann) – 3:28 →
"The Other One" (Weir, Kreutzmann) – 13:56 →
"Cryptical Envelopment" (Garcia) – 8:59 →
"Cosmic Charlie" (Garcia, Hunter) – 7:23
"Casey Jones" (Garcia, Hunter) – 4:45
"Good Lovin'" (Resnick, Clark) – 15:10

Disc three
Second set, continued
"It's a Man's World" (Brown, Jones, Newsome) – 10:04
"Dancing in the Streets" (Stevenson, Gaye, I. Hunter) – 15:42
Third Set
"Morning Dew" (Dobson, Rose) – 12:40
"Viola Lee Blues" (Lewis) – 16:35 →
"We Bid You Goodnight" (traditional) – 4:59

Personnel

Grateful Dead
Jerry Garcia – acoustic guitar (first set, except "Cumberland Blues"), lead electric guitar ("Cumberland Blues", second & third sets), vocals
Mickey Hart – drums, percussion
Bill Kreutzmann – drums, percussion
Phil Lesh – electric bass, vocals
Ron "Pigpen" McKernan – organ, harmonica, vocals
Bob Weir – acoustic guitar (first set), rhythm electric guitar (second & third sets), vocals

Additional musicians
John "Marmaduke" Dawson – vocals on "Cold Jordan"
David Nelson – acoustic guitar on "Cumberland Blues", mandolin on "Cold Jordan"

Production
Bob Matthews – recording
Dick Latvala – tape archivist
Jeffrey Norman – CD mastering
John Cutler – ferromagnetist
Gecko Graphics – design
Morris Zwerman – band photo
Richard Walinsky – CD liner notes

Notes

08
1997 live albums